Western Courage is a 1927 American silent Western film directed by Ben Wilson, starring Richard Hatton, Elsa Benham, and Robert Walker.

Cast
 Richard Hatton
 Elsa Benham
 Robert Walker
 Art Mix
 Ed La Niece
 Al Ferguson

References

1927 films
1927 Western (genre) films
Silent American Western (genre) films
American black-and-white films
Films directed by Ben F. Wilson
Rayart Pictures films
1920s English-language films
1920s American films